Topel or Töpel may refer to:

Topel Lee, Filipino film and music video director
Bernard Joseph Topel (1903–1986), American prelate of the Roman Catholic Church
Cengiz Topel (1934–1964), Turkish fighter pilot 
Cengiz Topel Naval Air Station in Turkey
Hjördis Töpel (1904–1987), Swedish freestyle swimmer and diver
Ingegärd Töpel (1906–1988), Swedish freestyle swimmer and diver, sister of Hjördis 
Zehra Topel (born 1987), Turkish chess player